Jovan Stanković (born 4 March 1971) is a Serbian retired football manager and former player who played as a left midfielder.

He spent the better part of his career with Red Star Belgrade and in Spain, most notably with Mallorca – he played a full decade in the latter country, also representing two other clubs.

Stanković represented Serbia and Montenegro at Euro 2000.

Club career
Stanković was born in Pirot, Socialist Federal Republic of Yugoslavia. Amongst other clubs, he played for Red Star Belgrade, Olympique de Marseille in France and RCD Mallorca and Atlético Madrid in Spain.

In 1998–99's Mallorca, Stanković contributed with four La Liga goals in 36 matches and several assists as the Balearic Islands side finished third and qualified to the UEFA Champions League. He scored in the subsequent third qualifying round against Molde FK through a penalty, but the 1–1 home draw eliminated the hosts on the away goals rule.

After being an instrumental unit in helping Atlético promote from Segunda División in the 2001–02 season, Stanković retired at the end of 2004–05 at the age of 34, following a spell with Catalonia's UE Lleida also in that tier. He later worked as an assistant manager to former Mallorca teammate Paco Soler, first in S.C. Beira-Mar (Portugal) then lowly CD Atlético Baleares.

As a head coach, Stanković was in charge of several teams in his country. He moved back to Spain in 2020, after being named manager of Segunda División B side San Fernando CD.

International career
Stanković was a Serbia and Montenegro international during two years, and was a participant at the UEFA Euro 2000 for a total of ten caps. His debut came on 23 September 1998, in a 1–1 friendly draw with Brazil.

References

External links

1971 births
Living people
Association football midfielders
Serbian footballers
Serbia and Montenegro footballers
Serbia and Montenegro international footballers
UEFA Euro 2000 players
FK Radnički Niš players
Red Star Belgrade footballers
FK Radnički Beograd players
RCD Mallorca players
Atlético Madrid footballers
UE Lleida players
Olympique de Marseille players
Yugoslav First League players
La Liga players
Segunda División players
Ligue 1 players
Serbia and Montenegro expatriate footballers
Expatriate footballers in Spain
Expatriate footballers in France
Serbia and Montenegro expatriate sportspeople in Spain
Serbia and Montenegro expatriate sportspeople in France
Serbian football managers
FK Iskra Danilovgrad managers
Segunda División B managers
Serbian expatriate football managers
Serbian expatriate sportspeople in Portugal
Expatriate football managers in Montenegro
Serbian expatriate sportspeople in Montenegro
Expatriate football managers in Spain
People from Pirot
Serbian expatriate sportspeople in Spain